Sankt Martin am Tennengebirge is a municipality in the St. Johann im Pongau district in the Austrian state of Salzburg.

Geography
The village is located in the Ennspongau of the Salzburger Land, in a side valley of the Fritztal, between the southern foot of the Tennen Mountains and the Gerzkopf, a foothill of the Dachstein massif. It also belongs to the Lammertal region, in which it has shares, and to which it represents the valley pass.

Culture and places of interest 

 Parish church of St. Martin am Tennengebirge, Gothic hall church of the 1430s with Baroque interior.

References

Gallery 

Cities and towns in St. Johann im Pongau District
Tennen Mountains
Dachstein Mountains